John Murton may refer to:
 John Murton (diplomat)
 John Murton (theologian)
 John Murton (footballer)

See also
 John Morton (disambiguation)